Henry Rosovsky (September 1, 1927 – November 11, 2022) was an American economist and academic administrator who served as dean of the faculty of arts and science of Harvard University. Following a career as an economic historian specializing in East Asia, Rosovsky was named Dean in 1973 by Harvard President Derek Bok.  He served from 1973 to 1984 and, again, in 1990 to 1991. He also served as Acting President of Harvard in 1984 and 1987.  In 1985, Rosovsky became a member of Harvard’s governing body, the Harvard Corporation, until 1997. He was the first Harvard faculty member to do so in a century.

Rosovsky was a Professor of Economics and chair of its Department of Economics.   He held the Geyser University Professorship Emeritus. He was married to retired former Harvard Semitic Museum curator and author Nitza Rosovsky. Together they have three children, Leah, Judith, and Michael. In May 2020, Leah Rosovsky was appointed Stanford Calderwood Director of the Boston Athenæum.

Early life
Born in the Free City of Danzig (Gdańsk) to Russian Jewish parents, Rosovsky grew up speaking Russian, German, and French. At age 13, Rosovsky came to the United States in 1940 with his family. He served in the US Army from 1946 to 1947 and again from 1950 to 1952. In 1949, he received his A.B. degree from the College of William and Mary and his Ph.D. degree from Harvard in 1959. He became a naturalized U.S. citizen in 1949.

Career

Professorship
Rosovsky taught economics, history and Japanese studies at the University of California at Berkeley until 1965. He has taught as a visiting professor in Japan and Israel and has worked as a consultant with the United States government, the Asian Development Bank, the World Bank and UNESCO.

In 2000, Rosovsky chaired the Task Force on Higher Education and Society with Mamphela Ramphele. The Task Force was convened by the World Bank and UNESCO to explore the future of higher education in developing countries. Its report, Peril and Promise, argued that higher education systems in poor countries are in crisis and made a case for renewed investment, curricular reform and improved standards of governance.

Publications
Rosovsky is the author of Capital Formation in Japan (1961), Quantitative Japanese Economic History (1961), Japanese Economic Growth (with K. Ohkawa, 1973) and The University: An Owner's Manual (1990). He also edited Industrialization in Two Systems (1961), Discord in the Pacific (1972), Asia's New Giant: How the Japanese Economy Works (with H. Patrick, 1976), Favorites of Fortune (with P. Higonnet and D. Landes, 1991) and The Political Economy of Japan: Cultural and Social Dynamics (with Shumpei Kumon, 1992).

Thomas Short of Commentary magazine praised The University as "a cozy book" where Rosovsky, with "a humorous, relentlessly self-deprecating manner," and shares "many anecdotes from his own career in higher education."

Awards
In 1981, Rosovsky received the Encyclopædia Britannica Achievement in Life Award for Achievement in Education, in 1987, received the Golden Plate Award of the American Academy of Achievement, and, in 1992, the Clark Kerr Medal for service to Higher Education from the University of California at Berkeley.  In 1984 the French government made him a Chevalier of the Legion of Honor; in 1988 he was awarded the Order of the Sacred Treasure (Star) by the Government of Japan. He was a member of both the American Academy of Arts and Sciences and the American Philosophical Society.

Death
Rosovsky died from cancer in Cambridge, Massachusetts, on November 11, 2022, at the age of 95.

Legacy

Harvard Hillel
Rosovsky was active in Harvard Hillel throughout his time at Harvard.  Harvard Hillel's building, Rosovsky Hall, was named after him in recognition of his leadership in the University's Jewish life and to acknowledge his role as the first Jewish member of the Harvard Corporation, the University's highest governing body. Rosovsky Hall was designed by architect, urban planner, educator, theorist, and author Moshe Safdie.

References

Further reading
 Bronfenbrenner, Martin, Shigeo Minabe, and Yasukichi Yasuba. "Asia's New Giant: Two Reviews." Journal of Japanese Studies (1977) 3#1 pp 145–167.

External links
Task Force on Higher Education website

1927 births
2022 deaths
American economists
American people of Russian-Jewish descent
Harvard University alumni
Harvard University faculty
College of William & Mary alumni
University of California, Berkeley faculty
Danzig emigrants to the United States
People from the Free City of Danzig
Fellows of the American Academy of Arts and Sciences
Naturalized citizens of the United States
Members of the American Philosophical Society
Chevaliers of the Légion d'honneur
Recipients of the Order of the Sacred Treasure